Batayporã is a municipality located in the Brazilian state of Mato Grosso do Sul. Its population was 11,349 (2020) and its area is 1,828 km2.

The town has some residential developments, but it is surrounded by agricultural land. It is located south of Anaurilândia at the junction of MS-395 the MS-134 (BR376), paved single lane highways.

Other towns in Brazil linked to Batayporã:
 Mariápolis
 Bataguassu
 Batatuba
 Anaurilândia

References

Municipalities in Mato Grosso do Sul
Bata Corporation